Wanless may refer to:

 Wanless (surname), an English surname
 Wanless, Manitoba, a hamlet in the Rural Municipality of Kelsey, Manitoba, Canada
 Wanless station
 Wanless, West Virginia, an unincorporated community in Pocahontas County, West Virginia, United States
 Wanless Park, a neighbourhood and park in Toronto, Ontario, Canada